"Houston (Means I'm One Day Closer to You)" is a song written by Larry Gatlin and recorded by American country music group Larry Gatlin & the Gatlin Brothers Band.  It was released in September 1983 as the first single from the album Houston to Denver.  The song was their third and last number-one on the country chart.  The single went to number one for two weeks and spent a total of 15 weeks on the country chart.

Recording

According to the album liner notes, this song was recorded before the rest of the album and was the only song on the album to be produced by and feature guitar from Larry Gatlin. The remainder of the album was produced by Rick Hall.

Personnel
According to the album liner notes.

Larry Gatlin and the Gatlin Brothers
 Larry Gatlin – lead vocals, guitar, producer
 Steve Gatlin – harmony and backing vocals
 Rudy Gatlin – harmony and backing vocals
Additional musicians and production staff
 Billy Sanford – lead guitar
 Leon Rhodes – lead guitar
 Buddy Emmons – pedal steel guitar
 Bob Moore – bass
 Mitch Humphries – keyboard
 Larrie Londin – drums
 Buddy Spicher – fiddle
 Ernie Winfrey – engineer

Chart performance

References

Songs about cities
1983 singles
1983 songs
Larry Gatlin songs
Columbia Records singles
Songs written by Larry Gatlin
Song recordings produced by Jerry Crutchfield